Nana Konadu Yiadom III is the Queen mother (Asantehemaa) of the Ashanti Kingdom. She is the 14th Queen mother of the kingdom.

Early life 
Nana Ama Konadu was born Nana Ama Konadu to Nana Afia Kobi Serwaa Ampem II and Opanin Kofi Fofie of Besease, near Atimatim in the Kwabre District of Ashanti. She is popularly known as Nana Panin as she is the first daughter of the late Asantehemaa. She is the eldest sister of the current Asantehene, Otumfuo Nana Osei Tutu II.

Reign 
Yiadom was enstooled as the Asantehemaa with the stool name Nana Konadu Yiadom III, after succeeding her mother and predecessor Nana Afia Kobi Serwaa Ampem II who died on 15 November 2016 in her sleep, aged 109. Before her death, her mother reigned as the Asantehemaa (Queen mother) for 39 years. 

Yiadom was enstooled as the Asantehemaa on 6 February 2017 and was publicly outdoored as by Otumfuo Nana Osei Tutu II on 6 May 2017, which also marked Otumfuo's 67th birthday at a ceremony at the Manhyia Palace in Kumasi. At the time 2017 when she ascended the stool she was 83 years old.

On 6 February 2017, a thanksgiving ceremony and a durbar were held at the Manhyia Palace in commemoration of her 5th anniversary since ascending the Asantehemaa stool.

References 

Ashanti royalty
African queen mothers
Ghanaian royalty
1930s births
Living people
Year of birth uncertain